Lifeline is a non-profit organisation that provides free, 24-hour telephone crisis support service in Australia. Volunteer crisis supporters provide suicide prevention services, mental health support and emotional assistance, not only via telephone but face-to-face and online.

The telephone service can be accessed by calling 13 11 14 within Australia.

Telephone crisis support is provided via a network of Lifeline Centres maintained by trained volunteers and some paid staff. Lifeline Centres are owned and operated by affiliate member organisations of Lifeline Australia, some of which are wholly owned subsidiaries of the national group, and some of which are local branches of the Uniting Church in Australia.

As at August 2022, there are 41 Lifeline Centres, spanning across 60 locations around Australia. About 11,000 volunteers deliver support services, while approximately 1,000 staff provide administration and fundraising co-ordination. Some Lifeline Centres also provide other support services which may include face-to-face counselling, group support, assistance with food and utility bills, support for the elderly and frail, and related services.

Lifeline has over 250 retail outlets around the country which sell a variety of clothes, furniture and bric-a-brac. Some Lifeline Centres have a number of stores but not all Lifeline Centres have retail outlets.

History
Lifeline was founded in Sydney, New South Wales, in 1963 by the late Sir Alan Walker after a call from a distressed man who three days later took his own life. Determined not to let loneliness, isolation and anxiety be the cause of other deaths, Walker launched a crisis line which initially operated out of the Methodist Central Mission (now known as Wesley Mission).

Lifeline Sydney was two years in planning and preparation, with 150 people attending a nine-month training course to work at the centre. A century old, dilapidated building owned by the Mission, on the fringes of downtown Sydney was renovated for the purposes of this new support centre. A staff of full-time employees was appointed to direct the work of these new telephone crisis support 'workers'. The Director General of Post and Telephone Services authorised that this crisis support service should be listed on the Emergency Page of the Telephone Directory and the phones were installed.

March 1963 saw the opening of the first official Lifeline Centre. The initiative was well received with over 100 calls for help being answered on the first day. The first call came one minute after the lines were opened and the phones have never stopped ringing.

In January 1964, Lifeline was featured in an article in Time magazine, which helped lead to the establishment of similar services around the world.

The first international convention of Lifeline was held in Sydney in August 1966 to guide the development of Lifeline services and to establish quality standards, which led to the formation of Lifeline International.

In 1994, Lifeline transitioned the 24-hour telephone crisis support line to a single national priority 13 number (13 11 14).

In 2007, Lifeline introduced national call flow to the 24-hour service. This allowed Lifeline to begin flowing calls nationally over a wide area network, to be answered by the next available telephone support volunteer, anywhere in the country.

Usage
Lifeline receives about one million requests for help every year. In the 2016–2017 financial year, the national charity received 933,408 calls to its 13 11 14 crisis line and 53,257 requests to its online Crisis Support Chat service. In 2016–2017, Lifeline reported an income stream consisting of 13% from community support, 72% through government grants and 15% from other sources. Income is then distributed to: service support (84%), fundraising and promotion (9%), and administration (7%).

Lifeline saw a marked increase of calls during the COVID-19 pandemic in Australia; where Lifeline would expect an average of 2,400 calls a day pre-pandemic, the organisation regularly received around 3,400 calls a day during the pandemic. In March 2020, Lifeline responded to almost 90,000 calls, equivalent to one every 30 seconds, with Lifeline receiving 3,200 calls on Friday 10 April 2020 alone. August 2021 was the busiest month in Lifeline's history, with their record for most calls in a single day being broken 4 times that month. On Thursday 19 August 2021, Lifeline received 3,505 calls, the single busiest day in the organisation's history.

Confidentiality
Despite allowing for anonymity, Lifeline will contact authorities and identify the caller in cases where they believe the person may be serious in taking their own life. Lifeline will disclose caller information if "we reasonably believe that the disclosure will prevent or lessen a serious and imminent threat to somebody's life, health or safety (including your own) or serious threat to public health, property or public safety".

Locations

Australian Capital Territory

New South Wales

Northern Territory

Queensland

South Australia

Tasmania

Victoria

Western Australia

See also
Crisis hotline
List of suicide crisis lines
Beyond Blue
Kids Helpline

References

External links
 Lifeline Australia

Organizations established in 1963
Medical and health organisations based in New South Wales
Mental health organisations in Australia
Suicide in Australia
Suicide prevention
Crisis hotlines
1963 establishments in Australia
Uniting Church in Australia